An Old Gregorian (usually abbreviated OG) is a former member of Downside School, situated near Bath, Somerset, in the United Kingdom.

Alumni are so-named because the school was founded and is still run, to an extent, by monks from the adjoining Benedictine monastery of St Gregory the Great which, since 1814, has been established at Downside Abbey.

Old Gregorians

A 
 Sir Rudolph Agnew – former chairman of Consolidated Goldfields
 Michael J. Alexander – academic and poet
 Sir Mark Allen – United Kingdom spy, turned businessman and academic lecturer
 Rupert Allason – author (under the pen-name Nigel West) and former Conservative MP
 Antony Nicholas Allott – English academic, Professor of African Law at the University of London
 Alistair Asprey – Secretary for Security for Hong Kong Government, Commanding Officer of Royal Hong Kong Auxiliary Air Force

B 
 Tom Bethell – editor of the American Spectator
 Fergus Blackie - Justice of The Supreme Court of Zimbabwe and Rhodesian Front MP
 Don Brennan – English cricketer
 Andrew Bonaparte-Wyse - Irish civil servant
 Sir Rowland Blennerhasset, 4th Baronet - Liberal Party politician
 Edward Cuthbert Butler - historian

C 
 Mark Canning- British diplomat and Former British Ambassador to Indonesia 
 William Cash – author and journalist
 Denis Caulfield Heron- Irish lawyer and politician 
 Jeremy Campbell-Lamerton- Scottish Rugby Union player
 Max Emanuel Cenčić - countertenor
 Alex Chisholm – Cabinet Office Permanent Secretary and Chief Operating Officer of the Civil Service
 Desmond Chute – poet and artist
 John Clibborn – British Intelligence Officer, served as MI6 head of station in Washington D.C
 Ralph Clutton – cricketer
 George Cooper (British Army officer) – British Army officer, served as Adjutant-General to the Forces
 Richard Cohen – author, editor, Fellow of the Royal Society of Literature
 Brian Cotter – former Liberal Democrat MP
 Archie Cotterell – cricketer and novelist
 Archbishop Maurice Noël Léon Couve de Murville – former Archbishop of Birmingham
 Thomas Clifford, 14th Baron Clifford of Chudleigh
 William Craven, 6th Earl of Craven
 Oliver Crosthwaite-Eyre – British Conservative Party Politician

D 
 John Charles Day – amongst the first Catholic judges in England to be appointed after the English Reformation 
 Pete de Freitas – musician, member of Echo & The Bunnymen
 Christian Louis de Massay – Monegasque royalty
 Arthur Denaro- Donegal raised Commanding Officer of the Queen's Royal Irish Hussars and later Commandant of Sandhurst
 Henry Eric Dolan- World War I flying ace
 John Drummond, 17th Earl of Perth – Minister for Colonial Affairs
 Prince Jonathan Doria Pamphilj
 Neil Dexter – former captain of Middlesex County Cricket Club

E 
 Dominick Elwes – portrait painter
 Barry England – novelist and playwright
 Sir Osmond Esmonde, 12th Baronet - Teachta Dála for Fine Gael
 Peter Evans-Freke, 11th Baron Carbery - Anglo Irish Peer
 Michael Evans-Freke, 12th Baron Carbery - Anglo Irish Peer

F 
 Rocco Forte – British hotelier and entrepreneur
 Edward Fitzgerald QC
 James Percy FitzPatrick – South African author, mining financier and pioneer of the fruit industry. Repsonsible for the two-minute silence observed on Armistice Day
 Nicolás Franco – nephew of Francisco Franco
 William Anthony Furness, 2nd Viscount Furness (1929–1995)
 Gerard Fairlie – writer, scriptwriter and Winter Olympian

G 
 Joseph Gaggero – Gibraltarian businessman
 Francis Aidan Gasquet – Cardinal, Vatican librarian
 Jan Gawroński - Polish diplomat
 Carlos Gereda y de Borbón – Spanish aristocrat, engineering entrepreneur and philanthropist 
 Brion Gysin – author and artist

H 
 Denis Hanley – electrical engineer and Conservative Party politician 
Jared Harris – actor
 Damian Harris – film director and screenwriter
 Jamie Harris (actor) – actor
 Simon Halliday – former England rugby player
 David Hawkins – Royal Air Force officer
 Steve Henderson (cricketer) – cricketer
Bobby Henrey – child actor, star of 'The Fallen Idol'
Denis Caulfield Heron - First Catholic Scholar at Trinity College, Dublin and MP for Tipperary
Tristram Hillier – surrealist painter
 Patrick Holcroft – Lord-Lieutenant of Worcestershire
Richard Holmes – biographer
 Henry Howard (diplomat) – first formal British envoy to the Vatican for over 300 hundred years
 Hubert Howard – intelligence officer
 Lord Hunt of Tanworth

J 
Christopher Jamison – Abbot of Worth
Philip Jebb – architect and Liberal Party politician

K 
 Chris Kelly – TV presenter and producer
 Norbert Keenan - Irish Barrister and Member of the Western Australian Legislative Assembly
 Ivone Kirkpatrick - Irish born Permanent Under-Secretary of State for Foreign Affairs, British High Commissioner at Allied High Commission and Ambassador of the United Kingdom to the Holy See
 David Knowles (scholar) - Regius Professor of Modern History at the University of Cambridge
 Halik Kochanski - Historian and writer

L 
 Sir John Leslie, 4th Baronet
 Dominic Lieven- professor at Cambridge University and Fellow of the British Academy
 John Lytton, 5th Earl of Lytton- British chartered surveyor, peer, and Member of the House of Lords

M 
 Seán MacBride - Teachta Dála, Minister for Foreign Affairs (Ireland), Chief of Staff of the IRA and Nobel Peace Prize Winner
 Frank MacDermot - Teachta Dála and founder of Fine Gael
 Alex Mapelli-Mozzi – alpine skier
 Patrick Marnham – writer, journalist and biographer
 Pierce McCan- Teachta Dála and Easter Rising Veteran
 Pierre Maréchal- Racing Driver who died during 24 Hours of Le Mans
 Patrick Mason- Director of the Abbey Theatre 
 Alexander McDonnell, 9th Earl of Antrim
 Nicholas Mander – Sir Charles Nicholas Mander, 4th Baronet
 Gerald Maxwell MC – First World War flying ace
 Prince Emmanuel de Merode – Director of the Virunga National Park in the Democratic Republic of the Congo
 James Miller – journalist and film-maker
 David Mlinaric – interior designer
 Joseph Molony - Chairman of the General Council of the Bar
 Richard More O'Ferrall - Governor of Malta and high level politician, of the prominent More O'Ferrall family.
 Peter Morgan – Oscar nominated scriptwriter
 John Mullan – professor of English and writer
 Helenus Milmo – Irish lawyer and High Court Judge

N 
Albert Nelson, 6th Earl Nelson
Henry Nelson, 7th Earl Nelson
 Martin Newland – former editor of The Daily Telegraph
 Barry Nicholas – classicist, former Principal of Brasenose College, Oxford
 William Nicholson – playwright and Oscar winner
Marek Niedużak - lawyer
 Michael Noakes – artist
 John Norman – first-class cricketer
 Stafford Northcote, 4th Earl of Iddesleigh

O 
 Sir Tim O'Brien, 3rd Baronet- England Cricket Team Player 
 John O'Brien- Ireland Cricket Team Player 
 Daniel O'Connell - Leader of the movement for Catholic emancipation, Irish Nationalist and MP 
 Charles Owen O'Conor, O'Conor Don - Liberal MP for Roscommon and President of Gaelic League
 Denis Charles Joseph O'Conor - hereditary Chief of the Name O'Conor
 Denis Maurice O'Conor - Liberal MP for Sligo County
  Denis Armar O'Conor, O'Conor Don -  Irish nobleman
 Denis Maurice O'Conor - former Lord Justice of Appeal
 Mervyn O'Gorman- British electrical and aircraft engineer
 Denis Ormerod- first Roman Catholic commander of the Ulster Defence Regiment

P 
 Anthony Palliser – artist
 Tony Pearson – cricketer
 Nigel Poett – British Army Officer, commanded the 5th Parachute Brigade during the second world war
 John Bede Polding – first Archbishop of Sydney
 Francis Pollen – architect, worked on buildings at the Abbey and school
 Philip Pope – actor and composer
 James Pope-Hennessy – biographer and travel writer
 John Pope-Hennessy – former director of the British Museum
 Edmund Purdom – film actor
 Nicholas Preston, 17th Viscount Gormanston – art connoisseur and aristocrat
 Jonathan Pugh – cartoonist

R 
 Rev. Timothy Radcliffe, OP – Master of the Order of Preachers (Dominicans) from 1992 to 2001
 Peter Rawlinson, Baron Rawlinson of Ewell – Solicitor General and Attorney General
 George William Rendel – diplomat 
 Dan Riddiford – New Zealand politician of the National Party
 Michael Richey – navigator and author
 Jerome Roche – musicologist
 Tremayne Rodd, 3rd Baron Rennell – Conservative peer - Scottish rugby international
 Nicholas Rossiter – TV producer

S 
 John de Salis, 9th Count de Salis-Soglio – ICRC delegate and envoy
 Hilary St George Saunders – author
 Wilfrid Sheed – novelist and essayist
 Todd Sharpville – musician
 Arthur Sidgreaves – businessman, head of Rolls-Royce during the Second World War
 Eugene Simon – actor
 Sir John Smythe, 8th Baronet – cricketer
 Sir Robert Stapylton – courtier, dramatic poet and translator
 Richard Stokes – former Lord Privy Seal
 Christopher Sykes – author
 John Sweetman - Founder of Sinn Féin
 Roger Sweetman - Teachta Dála for Sinn Féin and abstentionist MP

T 
 Artur Tarnowski - politician
 Simon Tolkien – author and novelist
 Rudolph de Trafford – aristocrat and banker
 Maurice Turnbull – Welsh rugby international and Test cricketer
 Bernard Turnbull –  former captain of Wales Rugby Team
 Paolo Tullio – writer, radio/TV personality and Michelin star-winning chef

U 
 James Underwood – pathologist
 William Bernard Ullathorne – English prelate

V 
 John Varley – former CEO of Barclays
 Hugh Vyvyan – captain of Saracens Rugby

W 

 Auberon Waugh – journalist
Robert Walker, Baron Walker of Gestingthorpe – former Justice of the Supreme Court of the United Kingdom
Patrick Wall – Royal Marines officer and Conservative politician
 Charles Walmesley – Procurator General, astronomer and mathematician
 Dennis Walters – Conservative Party politician 
 Charles Wegg-Prosser – politician 
 Arthur B. Woods – film director
 Douglas Woodruff – editor of the Tablet

Z 
 Count Adam Zamoyski – historian

References

Bibliography
List of Boys at St Gregory's, Downside Abbey, Bath, 1972: covers 1614–1972.
List of Boys at St Gregory's: First Supplement, Downside Abbey, Bath, 1983: covers 1967–1982 and lists corrections to the 1972 publication.

External links 
Official OG website

People educated at Downside School
Lists of people by English school affiliation
Old Gregorians